The 1992 Country Music Association Awards, 26th Ceremony, was held on September 30, 1992 at the Grand Ole Opry House, Nashville, Tennessee, and was hosted by CMA Award Winners, Vince Gill and Reba McEntire.

Winners and Nominees 
Winner are in Bold.

Hall of Fame

References 

Country Music Association
CMA
Country Music Association Awards
Country Music Association Awards
Country Music Association Awards
Country Music Association Awards
20th century in Nashville, Tennessee
Events in Nashville, Tennessee